Estadio Norberto "Tito" Tomaghello is a stadium located in the Gobernador Costa district of Florencio Varela Partido in Greater Buenos Aires, Argentina. It is the home ground for club Defensa y Justicia. The stadium, inaugurated in 1978, has a current capacity for 20,000 spectators.

Originally named "Estadio General José de San Martín, in December 1990 the venue was renamed "Norberto Tito Tomaghello" to honor a longtime president of the club.

History 
The stadium was inaugurated on February 26, 1978, in a friendly match v a Boca Juniors third division (with some professional players in the starting line-up). In November 1979 a lighting system was installed.

The Norberto Tomaghello stadium is a football stadium located in the town of Gobernador Costa, Florencio Varela's party, in the southern area of the Buenos Aires suburbs. It was inaugurated on February 26, 1978 and its owner is the Defensa y Justicia Social and Sports Club. That day, the Falcon played a match against the third team of Boca Juniors, which also had some professionals. In November 1979, and before the same team, artificial lighting was released.

During the first years of the 2000s, the stadium still had a local grandstand (with capacity for 3,600), a visiting team grandstand with a similar capacity (3,500) and a wooden luxury stand which housed 10 press booths on two floors. In those years, the wooden structures were replaced by concrete stands with individual seats. At the same time, more press boxes were added. Subsequently, towards the end of 2011, an important investment was made for the construction of new lighting towers and a new lighting system. The sector of cabins and boxes was expanded again, going on to have 26 and 15, respectively.

In 2014, on the eve of promotion to the first division, the general grandstand, which until then was the visiting one, doubled its capacity: from 3,500 people to 7,000 seats. It premiered on May 19, 2014, in a match against Ferro Carril Oeste. At the end of 2014, on one of the sides of the playing field where the substitute benches are currently located, the construction of a new stall began. The building finished that same year and has 1000 seats. This sector premiered on February 23, 2015, on the second fixture of the Argentine championship against San Lorenzo. 

When some of the wooden stands broke during a match vs River Plate in 2016 causing three Defensa y Justicia supporters fell, the stadium was closed for safety reasons. To solve the problem, the club signed a contract for the total renovation of the grandstands in that sector. The new stands were inaugurated on August 26, 2017 in a match vs Gimnasia y Esgrima LP. In order to participate in international competitions (such as Copa Sudamericana and Copa Libertadores), Defensa y Justicia signed an agreement with Brightness LLC company for the installation of a new LED lighting system. The light towers were inaugurated in January 2020 in a match vs Talleres de Córdoba.

In February 2021, it was announced that the club was planning to refurbish the stadium again, installing a new seating area (including press booths) for 8,000 spectators.

References

External links

 Photo gallery at Estadiosdeargentina.com.ar

n
n
s